The 1893–94 season was the eleventh to be played by the team now known as Bristol Rovers, and their tenth playing under the name Eastville Rovers. The first team continued to play in the first division of the Bristol & District League (now known as the Western Football League), while the reserves became founding members of the second division of the same competition.

Season review
Eastville Rovers began the season in confident mood. They had moved to a new ground in Ridgeway (sometimes referred to in contemporary reports as Rudgeway) on a site shared with Bristol North Cricket Club, which they had felt would improve attendances due to it being closer to Eastville than their former home in Ashley Down. They also welcomed many new players into the club thanks to a merger with St Gabriel's Association Football Club, enabling the formation of a third team to play alongside the firsts and reserves. It would prove to be a bitter-sweet campaign however as although the first team managed to reach the final of the Gloucestershire Cup, both the firsts and reserves finished just one place above the bottom of their respective league tables.

League tables

Bristol & District League Division One

Bristol & District League Division Two

Match results

Bristol & District League

Division One

Division Two

The date and result of the away game against Mangotsfield reserves is not known. The final three games were played over the Easter week of 1894 and all took place at the Chequers ground in Kingswood.

Gloucestershire Senior Challenge Cup
Eastville Rovers were drawn away to Mangotsfield in the first round.

Gloucestershire Junior Challenge Cup

Friendlies

First team

Reserves

Third team
The name of the club's third team was given variously as Eastville Rovers Extras, Eastville Rovers A, or simply Eastville Rovers. The name of the team as it was reported in the local press for each match is shown in the table below.

Notes

Statistics
Friendly matches are not included in this section.

Cumulative record
The total cumulative record of Eastville Rovers up to the end of the 1893–94 season is shown below. This is calculated by adding the numbers in the section above to the total games played up to the end of the previous season. Friendly matches are not included in this table, and games held at neutral venues are considered to have been played away from home.

References

Bibliography

Bristol Rovers F.C. seasons
Eastville Rovers